James Nathaniel Halpin (October 4, 1863 – January 4, 1893), a native of England, was a Major League Baseball shortstop/third baseman.  He played for the Worcester Ruby Legs (1882), Washington Nationals (1884 Union Association), and Detroit Wolverines (1885).  At just 18 years of age, he was the youngest player to appear in a National League game in 1882.

Halpin made his major league debut in a home game against the Buffalo Bisons at Worcester Driving Park Grounds.  The Ruby Legs defeated future Hall of Famer Pud Galvin 6-3.  Halpin played just one more game for Worcester before returning to the big leagues two years later.

In 63 total games he hit .165 (38-for-230) with 5 doubles and 27 runs scored.  He was a slightly below-average fielder for his era, making 51 errors in 263 total chances (.806).

Halpin died at the age of 29 in Boston, Massachusetts.

External links
Baseball Reference
Retrosheet

Major League Baseball shortstops
Major League Baseball players from the United Kingdom
Major League Baseball players from England
English baseball players
Worcester Ruby Legs players
Washington Nationals (UA) players
Detroit Wolverines players
19th-century baseball players
1863 births
1893 deaths
Reading Actives players
Newburyport Clamdiggers players
Biddeford (minor league baseball) players
Brockton (minor league baseball) players
Utica Pent Ups players
Manchester Farmers players
New Haven Blues players
Albany Governors players
Newark Little Giants players
Wilmington Blue Hens players